Shibumi may refer to:

 Shibui, Japanese aesthetics, the noun form of which is shibumi
 Shibumi (novel), 1979 novel by Trevanian
 Shibumi (restaurant), a Michelin-starred restaurant in Los Angeles, California